In relativity, rapidity is commonly used as a measure for relativistic velocity. Mathematically, rapidity can be defined as the hyperbolic angle that differentiates two frames of reference in relative motion, each frame being associated with distance and time coordinates.

For one-dimensional motion, rapidities are additive whereas velocities must be combined by Einstein's velocity-addition formula. For low speeds, rapidity and velocity are proportional but, for higher velocities, rapidity takes a larger value, with the rapidity of light being infinite.

Using the inverse hyperbolic function , the rapidity  corresponding to velocity  is  where c is the velocity of light. Since in relativity any velocity  is constrained to the interval  the ratio  satisfies . The inverse hyperbolic tangent has the unit interval  for its domain and the whole real line for its image; that is, the interval  maps onto .

History

In 1908 Hermann Minkowski explained how the Lorentz transformation could be seen as simply a hyperbolic rotation of the spacetime coordinates, i.e., a rotation through an imaginary angle. This angle therefore represents (in one spatial dimension) a simple additive measure of the velocity between frames. The rapidity parameter replacing velocity was introduced in 1910 by Vladimir Varićak and by E. T. Whittaker. The parameter was named rapidity by Alfred Robb (1911) and this term was adopted by many subsequent authors, such as Silberstein (1914), Morley (1936) and Rindler (2001).

Area of a hyperbolic sector

The quadrature of the hyperbola xy = 1 by Gregoire de Saint-Vincent established the natural logarithm as the area of a hyperbolic sector, or an equivalent area against an asymptote. In spacetime theory,  the connection of events by light divides the universe into Past, Future, or Elsewhere based on a Here and Now . On any line in space, a light beam may be directed left or right. Take the x-axis as the events passed by the right beam and the y-axis as the events of the left beam. Then a resting frame has time along the diagonal x = y. The rectangular hyperbola xy = 1 can be used to gauge velocities (in the first quadrant). Zero velocity corresponds to (1,1). Any point on the hyperbola has light-cone coordinates  where w is the rapidity, and is equal to the area of the hyperbolic sector from (1,1) to these coordinates. Many authors refer instead to the unit hyperbola  using rapidity for parameter, as in the standard spacetime diagram. There the axes are measured by clock and meter-stick, more familiar benchmarks, and the basis of spacetime theory. So the delineation of rapidity as hyperbolic parameter of beam-space is a reference to the seventeenth century origin of our precious transcendental functions, and a supplement to spacetime diagramming.

Lorentz boost
The rapidity  arises in the linear representation of a Lorentz boost as a vector-matrix product
.

Such matrices form the indefinite orthogonal group O(1,1) with one-dimensional Lie algebra spanned by the anti-diagonal unit matrix, showing that the rapidity is the coordinate on this Lie algebra. This action may be depicted in a spacetime diagram.

It is not hard to prove that
.

where  denotes the rapidity of a frame of reference  relative to a frame of reference . The simplicity of this formula contrasts with the complexity of the corresponding velocity-addition formula.

As we can see from the Lorentz transformation above, the Lorentz factor identifies with 

,

so the rapidity  is implicitly used as a hyperbolic angle in the Lorentz transformation expressions using  and β. We relate rapidities to the velocity-addition formula

by recognizing

and so

Proper acceleration (the acceleration 'felt' by the object being accelerated) is the rate of change of rapidity with respect to proper time (time as measured by the object undergoing acceleration itself). Therefore, the rapidity of an object in a given frame can be viewed simply as the velocity of that object as would be calculated non-relativistically by an inertial guidance system on board the object itself if it accelerated from rest in that frame to its given speed.

Exponential and logarithmic relations

From the above expressions we have

and thus

or explicitly

In experimental particle physics
The energy  and scalar momentum  of a particle of non-zero (rest) mass  are given by:

With the definition of 

and thus with

the energy and scalar momentum can be written as:

So, rapidity can be calculated from measured energy and momentum by

However, experimental particle physicists often use a modified definition of rapidity relative to a beam axis

where  is the component of momentum along the beam axis.  This is the rapidity of the boost along the beam axis which takes an observer from the lab frame to a frame in which the particle moves only perpendicular to the beam.  Related to this is the concept of pseudorapidity.

Rapidity relative to a beam axis can also be expressed as

See also

 Bondi k-calculus
 Lorentz transformation
 Pseudorapidity
 Proper velocity
 Theory of relativity

Notes and references

 Varićak V (1910), (1912), (1924) See Vladimir Varićak#Publications 
 
 
 Borel E (1913) La théorie de la relativité et la cinématique, Comptes Rendus Acad Sci Paris 156 215-218; 157 703-705
 
 Vladimir Karapetoff (1936)"Restricted relativity in terms of hyperbolic functions of rapidities", American Mathematical Monthly 43:70.
 Frank Morley (1936) "When and Where", The Criterion, edited by T.S. Eliot, 15:200-2009.
 Wolfgang Rindler (2001) Relativity: Special, General, and Cosmological, page 53, Oxford University Press.
 Shaw, Ronald (1982) Linear Algebra and Group Representations, v. 1, page 229, Academic Press .
 (see page 17 of e-link)
 

Special relativity